Zuzanna Herasimowicz (born 7 July 2002) is a Polish swimmer. She competed in the women's 200 metre backstroke at the 2019 World Aquatics Championships.

References

External links
 

2002 births
Living people
Place of birth missing (living people)
Polish female backstroke swimmers
21st-century Polish women